Chthonerpeton braestrupi is a species of amphibian in the family Typhlonectidae.It is endemic to Brazil.
Its natural habitats are rivers, swamps, freshwater marshes, intermittent freshwater marshes, pastureland, irrigated land, seasonally flooded agricultural land, canals and ditches.

References

braestrupi
Endemic fauna of Brazil
Amphibians described in 1968
Taxonomy articles created by Polbot